The 2011 NACRA Women's Rugby Championship was the second tournament, hosted by the Cayman Islands, saw the return to competition of island teams from Trinidad and Tobago, Jamaica and hosts, the Cayman Islands; but no teams from outside the Caribbean, possibly because the tournament clashed with the U20 Nations Cup. Other islands were again represented by a Caribbean Select XV. For the first time, all matches in the tournament were streamed live by Cayman Rugby TV. Trinidad and Tobago won the Championship as they went undefeated in the competition.

Table

Results

Scorers

Notes

References 

Women's rugby union competitions for national teams
Rugby union competitions in North America
Rugby union competitions in the Caribbean
Women's rugby union in North America